Little Dalby is a village and former civil parish, now in the parish of Burton and Dalby, in the Melton district, in the county of Leicestershire, England. In 1931 the parish had a population of 118. On 1 April 1936 the parish was abolished to form "Burton and Dalby".

The Little Dalby Estate is the Ernest Cook Trust's largest and, in many ways, its most complete estate. A further  comprising Grange Farm, Leesthorpe, was purchased in 1977 with an additional , forming Jericho Farm, in 2000. The estate includes Burrough Hill hillfort.

The parish church of St James was remodelled in 1851 and is listed Grade II*.

Anthony Turner,  one of the Jesuits wrongfully executed  for treason  during the fabricated Popish Plot, was born in Little Dalby,  where his father Toby Turner was Rector,  in 1628.

References

External links

Little Dalby and the Ernest Cook Trust

Villages in Leicestershire
Former civil parishes in Leicestershire
Borough of Melton